Kihnu Parish is a rural municipality of Estonia, in Pärnu County. The parish covers the 16.88 km² area of Kihnu island, making it one of the smallest parishes in Estonia.  As of 2010, Kihnu Parish had an estimated population of 489.  In 2003, UNESCO named Kihnu Island's culture as a Masterpiece of the Oral and Intangible History of Humanity, placing the island on the organization's Intangible Cultural Heritage list.

Settlements
There are 4 villages in Kihnu Parish: Lemsi, Linaküla, Rootsiküla and Sääre.

Religion

References

External links